Christopher Barker (c.1529–1599) was the printer to Queen Elizabeth I. He was also the father of a printing dynasty that included his son Robert Barker, his grandsons Robert Constable and Francis Constable, and Richard Constable who is believed to be his grandson. He is most well-known for printing many editions of English Bibles during the Elizabethan Age, notably the Geneva Bible and the so-called Bishops' Bible. He was the official printer of the court of Elizabeth I of England and held exclusive patents to print Bibles.

The University of Glasgow, from their Printing in England from William Caxton to Christopher Barker, An Exhibition: November 1976 – April 1977 had this to say about Christopher's life and work:

References

Initials and ornaments

1529 births
1599 deaths
English printers
16th-century English businesspeople
16th-century printers
Bible history